Nancy Chu Ip Yuk-yu, as known as Nancy Y. Ip in academic publications, is a Hong Kong neuroscientist. She is serving as the 5th President of the Hong Kong University of Science and Technology (HKUST) since 19 October 2022. She had served as the Vice-President of Research and Development, the Morningside Professor of Life Science, and Director of the State Key Laboratory of Molecular Neuroscience at the HKUST.  Since December 2022, Ms. Ip has also served as the a deputy from the Hong Kong delegation to the National People's Congress and received the largest number of votes from the 1273 member Electoral Committee which elects delegates, receiving 1254 votes

Biography
Nancy Ip was born in Hong Kong, with her ancestral home in Taishan, Guangdong. She is the youngest of six children. She attended secondary education at St. Mary's Canossian College.  

She received her bachelor degree in Chemistry and Biology from Simmons College in 1977, and she earned a doctorate in pharmacology from Harvard University Medical School in 1983. After graduation, she spent the early part of her scientific career in the USA, and was Senior Staff Scientist at Regeneron Pharmaceuticals, New York.

Since joining The Hong Kong University of Science and Technology in 1993, Ip served as Dean of Science, the Director of the Biotechnology Research Institute, and the Head of the Department of Biochemistry. She is currently the Vice-President for Research and Development, the Morningside Professor of Life Science, and Director of the State Key Laboratory of Molecular Neuroscience at the University

She has been elected to the Chinese Academy of Sciences (2001), the World Academy of Sciences (2004), the US National Academy of Sciences (2015), the Hong Kong Academy of Sciences (2015), the American of Arts and Sciences (2016), and the Chinese Academy of Medical Sciences (2019).

In 2004, she received the L'Oréal-UNESCO Awards for Women in Science Award at the 6th Annual L'Oréal-UNESCO For Women in Science Awards for her discoveries on the molecular control of growth, differentiation and synapse formation in the nervous system.

Research 

Ip has made seminal discoveries in the biology of neurotrophic factors, specifically proteins that support the growth, survival, and differentiation of both developing and mature neurons. Her recent research to understand the deregulation of signaling pathways mediated by different classes of cell surface receptors has led to critical insights on the mechanisms underlying the pathogenesis of Alzheimer's disease, and unveiled new molecular targets and potential therapeutic strategies for the disease.

Award
 1998 - Croucher Foundation Senior Research Fellowship
 2001 - Academician of the Chinese Academy of Sciences
 2003 & 2011 - State Natural Science Award, State Council of the People's Republic of China
 2004 - Fellow, The World Academy of Sciences
 2004 - L'Oréal-UNESCO Awards for Women in Science
 2008 - Prize for Scientific and Technological Progress of Ho Leung Ho Lee Foundation
 2008 - Medal of Honor, Hong Kong SAR Government
 2011 - Chevalier de l'Ordre National du Merite, France
 2014 - Justice of Peace, Hong Kong SAR Government
 2015 - Founding Member, The Academy of Sciences of Hong Kong
 2016 - Foreign Associate, US National Academy of Sciences
 2016 - Foreign Honorary Member, American Academy of Arts and Sciences
 2016 - 10 Science Stars of China by Nature
 2017 - Bronze Bauhinia Star (BBS), Hong Kong SAR Government
 2019 - Fellow of the Chinese Academy of Medical Sciences

Further reading

References

External links 
 Ip Lab - Molecular Neuroscience Laboratory (ust.hk)

 

 

1955 births
Living people
21st-century American women scientists
American women academics
Chinese women biologists
Chinese women neuroscientists
Delegates to the 14th National People's Congress from Hong Kong
Foreign associates of the National Academy of Sciences
Harvard Medical School alumni
Hong Kong women scientists
Academic staff of the Hong Kong University of Science and Technology
L'Oréal-UNESCO Awards for Women in Science laureates
Members of the Chinese Academy of Sciences
Presidents of the Hong Kong University of Science and Technology
Simmons University alumni
TWAS fellows